is a Japanese football player. He plays as a forward and is known for his powerful shots and short-ranged free kicks.

References

1985 births
Living people
Albirex Niigata Singapore FC players
Blaublitz Akita players
Japanese footballers
Singapore Premier League players
Association football forwards